Alexander Lawrence Lacey (born 31 May 1993) is an English footballer who plays as a central defender for Hartlepool United.

Career

Luton Town
Born in Milton Keynes, Buckinghamshire, Lacey joined the Luton Town youth set-up as a first-year scholar in 2007. As a 16-year-old, he was an unused substitute during Luton's narrow 1–0 defeat to League One side Southampton in the FA Cup in January 2010.

He signed a professional contract with Luton in November 2010 and made his first-team debut a month later, starting against Welling United in a 0–0 draw in the FA Trophy. He made two further starts in the club's FA Trophy campaign, which culminated in Luton being defeated in the semi-final to Mansfield Town. Lacey made his league debut as a substitute on 30 April 2011 in a 1–1 draw against Wrexham.

He played the full 90 minutes of a pre-season friendly in July 2011 against Southern League Premier Division side Cambridge City, with his display in defence described as "impeccable" and "assured". Lacey's performance was not overlooked by Cambridge City, who subsequently signed him on loan for an initial month, alongside fellow Luton youth player JJ O'Donnell, on 12 August 2011. This loan was later extended until October. Lacey returned to Luton having made 14 appearances, and then joined Conference South side Thurrock on loan for a month in November. He played three times in this loan period, and then played in three FA Trophy games upon his return to Luton. He was sent to Eastbourne Borough on loan for the final two months of the 2011–12 season, making 14 appearances and scoring two goals as he helped the club narrowly avoid relegation. Lacey was linked with moves to Championship sides Southampton and Burnley, but signed a new two-year contract with Luton in June 2012.

Injuries prevented Lacey from breaking into the Luton first-team at the beginning of the 2012–13 season and, when fit, manager Paul Buckle preferred to use the loan market for young defenders, bringing in Connor Essam and Simon Ainge. Lacey joined Conference South side Eastleigh in January 2013 on a one-month loan that was later extended until the end of the season. He played in both legs of Eastleigh's play-off semi-final in April 2013, which ended in a penalty shoot-out defeat to Dover Athletic. He returned to Luton having played in 20 games, scoring once, and was praised for his performances both at centre-back and right-back.

Paul Buckle had been replaced at Luton by experienced manager John Still towards the end of the 2012–13 season. Still named Lacey as Luton's captain during their 2013–14 pre-season games to improve his communication skills. On the opening day of the 2013–14 season, an injury to regular captain Ronnie Henry and a red card for vice-captain Steve McNulty meant that Lacey, at the age of 20, had the unusual distinction of captaining Luton on his first league start for the club; a 1–0 defeat to Southport. Lacey played in central defence in Luton's opening six games of the 2013–14 season, during which the team kept four clean sheets. He scored his first goal for the club in a 4–0 win against Woking on 25 September 2013 and remained in the starting XI as Luton embarked on a club-record 27 league game unbeaten run. He fractured a metatarsal in a 3–0 win against Southport in November 2013, which sidelined him for three months. By the time Lacey had recovered, he had been replaced in central defence by Fraser Franks. With his Luton contract set to expire at the end of the season, Lacey was linked with potential moves to Bournemouth, Charlton Athletic, Millwall and Peterborough United. However, on 3 April 2014, Lacey signed a two-year contract extension with Luton. Luton won the Conference Premier title during the 2013–14 season, with Lacey playing in a total of 21 league games.

He made his Football League debut on the opening day of the 2014–15 season, playing in a new position as a defensive midfielder as Luton beat Carlisle United 1–0. He played in a total of 20 matches throughout the campaign, often as a substitute, and was placed on the transfer list at the end of the season.

Yeovil Town
On 22 July 2015, Lacey joined League Two side Yeovil Town on a free transfer, signing a two-year deal. He scored his first goal for Yeovil in an EFL Trophy match against Milton Keynes Dons on 6 December 2016. Lacey also scored in three League 2 ties; a 2-1 home win against Plymouth Argyle, a 3–1 away win at Morecambe and a 3–3 draw away at Exeter City. He was a near ever-present in his second season at the club, featuring in 47 games in all competitions.

At the conclusion of the 2016–17 season, Lacey was awarded with the Green & White Supporters Club and Community Sports Trust Player of the Season trophies. In total, Lacey played 72 times during his two-year spell at Yeovil Town.

Gillingham

At the end of the 2016–17 season, Lacey rejected Yeovil's offer of a new contract, instead signing a two-year deal at League One side Gillingham under manager Adrian Pennock. He became Peter Taylor's first signing in his role as Director of Football at the club.

Although a series of injuries restricted Lacey's playing time in his first season at the club, his second season was more successful. Highlights included keeping a clean sheet in an early 0-0 draw away at Championship side Millwall's New Den in the League Cup (losing 3–1 on penalties after extra time), a pair of 2–0 wins over League One leaders Portsmouth (scoring the second in the away fixture at Fratton Park) as well as a notable performance in a televised 1–0 home victory over Premier League club Cardiff City in the third round of the FA Cup. However, playing time was again fairly limited thereafter, with his final appearance for Gillingham coming as a second-half substitute in a 3–0 away win at Blackpool on the last day of the season.

Lacey left Gillingham upon the expiry of his contract after the conclusion of the 2018–19 season.

Notts County
On 7 November 2019, Lacey joined National League side Notts County until the end of the 2019–20 season. After a brief pre-season, Lacey broke into the first team in December, making his début in a 4–2 away win at FC Halifax Town. County suffered just two defeats in the following twelve league games, keeping seven clean sheets in the process, culminating in a 4–0 televised thrashing of Eastleigh in what was considered 'the biggest match in England' due to the postponement of both the Football League and Premier League. With the club in 3rd place, the season ultimately postponed due to the COVID-19 pandemic and the final table decided on a points-per-game basis, Notts County beat Barnet 2–0 in their play-off semi-final at Meadow Lane before losing 3–1 to Harrogate Town in the play-off final at Wembley, with Lacey playing the full 90 minutes in both matches.

Despite interest from clubs in higher tiers, Lacey opted to extend his contract on 11 August 2020.

Following defeat in the play-offs eliminator, Lacey was released at the end of the 2021–22 season.

Hartlepool United
On 24 June 2022, Lacey signed for League Two side Hartlepool United.

Career statistics

Honours

Club 

Luton Town

Conference Premier: 2013–14

Individual 

 Yeovil Town: Green & White Supporters Club and Community Sports Trust Player of the Season 2016–17

References

External links

1993 births
Living people
People from Milton Keynes
English footballers
Association football defenders
Luton Town F.C. players
Cambridge City F.C. players
Thurrock F.C. players
Eastbourne Borough F.C. players
Eastleigh F.C. players
Yeovil Town F.C. players
Gillingham F.C. players
Notts County F.C. players
Hartlepool United F.C. players
National League (English football) players
English Football League players
Footballers from Buckinghamshire